Mercury(II) sulfate, commonly called mercuric sulfate, is the chemical compound HgSO4. It is an odorless solid that forms white granules or crystalline powder. In water, it separates into an insoluble sulfate with a yellow color and sulfuric acid.

Structure

The anhydrous compound features Hg2+ in a highly distorted tetrahedral HgO4 environment.  Two Hg-O distances are 2.22 Å and the others are 2.28 and 2.42 Å.  In the monohydrate,  Hg2+ adopts a linear coordination geometry with Hg-O (sulfate) and Hg-O (water) bond lengths of 2.179 and 2.228 Å, respectively.  Four weaker bonds are also observed with Hg---O distances >2.5 Å.

History
In 1932, the Japanese chemical company Chisso Corporation began using mercury sulfate as the catalyst for the production of acetaldehyde from acetylene and water. Though it was unknown at the time, methylmercury is formed as side product of this reaction. Exposure and consumption of the mercury waste products, including methylmercury, that were dumped into Minamata Bay by Chisso are believed to be the cause of Minamata disease in Minamata, Japan.

Production
Mercury sulfate can be produced
by treating mercury with hot concentrated sulfuric acid:
Hg + 2 H2SO4 → HgSO4 + SO2 + 2 H2O

Alternatively yellow mercuric oxide reacts also with concentrated sulfuric acid.

Uses

Denigés' reagent
An acidic solution of mercury sulfate is known as Denigés' reagent. It was commonly used throughout the 20th century as a qualitative analysis reagent. If Denigés' reagent is added to a solution containing compounds that have tertiary alcohols, a yellow or red precipitate will form.

Production of acetaldehyde
As previously mentioned, Hg S O4 was used as the catalyst for the production of acetaldehyde from acetylene and water.

Oxymercuration-demercuration of alkenes
Mercury Compounds such as mercury sulfate and mercury(II) acetate are commonly used as catalysts in the oxymercuration-demercuration, a type of Electrophilic Addition reaction. The hydration of an alkene results in an alcohol that follows regioselectivity that is predicted by Markovnikov's Rule.

Hydration of alkynes
The reaction scheme is provided below. The conversion of 2,5-dimethyhexyn-2,5-diol to 2,2,5,5-tetramethylte-trahydrofuran using aqueous mercury sulfate without the addition of acid.

Health issues
Inhalation of HgSO4 can result in acute poisoning: causing tightness in the chest, difficulties breathing, coughing and pain. Exposure of HgSO4 to the eyes can cause ulceration of conjunctiva and cornea. If mercury sulfate is exposed to the skin it may cause sensitization dermatitis. Lastly, ingestion of mercury sulfate will cause necrosis, pain, vomiting, and severe purging. Ingestion can result in death within a few hours due to peripheral vascular collapse.

It was used in the late 19th century to induce vomiting for medical reasons.

References

External links

 National Pollutant Inventory – Mercury and compounds Fact Sheet
 NIOSH Pocket Guide to Chemical Hazards

Sulfates
Mercury(II) compounds